A discharger in electronics is a device or circuit that releases stored energy or electric charge from a battery, capacitor or other source.

Discharger types include:
 metal probe with insulated handle & ground wire, and sometimes resistor (for capacitors)
 resistor (for batteries)
 parasitic discharge (for batteries arranged in parallel)
 more complex electronic circuits (for batteries)

See also Bleeder resistor

Electronic circuits